The Free routine combination competition at the 2022 World Aquatics Championships was held on 18 and 20 June 2022.

Results
The preliminary round was started on 18 June at 10:00. The final was held on 20 June at 16:00.

References

Free routine combination